1980 ACC tournament may refer to:

 1980 ACC men's basketball tournament
 1980 ACC women's basketball tournament
 1980 Atlantic Coast Conference baseball tournament